Karel Potgieter (born 21 September 1975 in Pretoria) is a South African former shot put athlete who competed in the 2000 Summer Olympics, where he scored a 19.02 in the first heat, not enough to advance to the next round. His personal best is 20.29. He is the brother of fellow Olympian Frits Potgieter.

References

1975 births
Living people
South African male shot putters
Athletes (track and field) at the 2000 Summer Olympics
Olympic athletes of South Africa
Sportspeople from Pretoria
African Games bronze medalists for South Africa
African Games medalists in athletics (track and field)
Athletes (track and field) at the 1999 All-Africa Games